Thomas Damián Amilivia (born 13 July 1998) is an Argentine professional footballer who plays as a forward for Argentinos Juniors.

Career
Amilivia began his career with Sportivo Italiano. He was promoted into the club's first-team during the 2015 campaign, making his professional debut on 20 October against Deportivo Español; prior to netting his first goal two appearances later in a 2–1 defeat to Atlanta on 8 November. In 2016, Amilivia completed a move to Argentine Primera División side Argentinos Juniors. His first involvement with their senior squad arrived on 9 December 2018, as the forward was on the substitutes bench for a fixture with Aldosivi; he subsequently made his bow after being substituted on in place of Matías Romero for the final seconds of a home loss.

Career statistics
.

References

External links

1998 births
Living people
People from La Matanza Partido
Argentine footballers
Argentine expatriate footballers
Association football forwards
Sportivo Italiano footballers
Argentinos Juniors footballers
Deportivo Español footballers
Santiago Wanderers footballers
Argentine Primera División players
Primera B Metropolitana players
Primera C Metropolitana players
Primera B de Chile players
Expatriate footballers in Chile
Sportspeople from Buenos Aires Province